The American Association of Professional Baseball is an independent professional baseball league founded in 2005. It operates in the central United States and Canada, mostly in cities not served by Major League Baseball teams or their minor league affiliates. Joshua Schaub is the league commissioner. League offices are located in Moorhead, Minnesota.  Though a separate entity, the league shared a commissioner and director of umpires with the Canadian American Association of Professional Baseball during that league's existence. The American Association of Professional Baseball has 501(c)(6) tax-exempt status with the Internal Revenue Service. In 2020, as part of MLB's reorganization of the minor leagues, the American Association, together with the Atlantic League and the Frontier League, became an official MLB Partner League.

History
The American Association was founded in October 2005 when the St. Paul Saints, Lincoln Saltdogs, Sioux City Explorers, and Sioux Falls Canaries announced they were leaving the Northern League. Around the same time, the Central Baseball League announced it was disbanding after four seasons. The Fort Worth Cats, Shreveport-Bossier Sports, Pensacola Pelicans, Coastal Bend Aviators, and El Paso Diablos joined the four former Northern League teams and the expansion St. Joe Blacksnakes to form the American Association as a ten-team league. The new league began play in 2006, with a 96-game schedule, which has since expanded to 100 games.

2008 saw the league lose the Blacksnakes and Aviators, with the Grand Prairie AirHogs and Wichita Wingnuts joining in their place. In 2011 and 2012 the league went through a significant shift. Fort Worth was kicked out of the AA and moved to the North American League, while Shreveport and Pensacola both relocated. The Pelicans moved to Amarillo, Texas and became the Amarillo Sox (later the Amarillo Thunderheads) while Shreveport, who had changed their name to the Shreveport-Bossier Captains, moved to Laredo, Texas and became the Laredo Lemurs. In addition, four more Northern League franchises (Fargo-Moorhead RedHawks, Gary SouthShore RailCats, Kansas City T-Bones, and Winnipeg Goldeyes) joined the American Association as that league's stability came into question.

For the 2012 season, the American Association began interleague play with the Can-Am League. The two leagues were both headquartered in Durham, North Carolina, and both had Miles Wolff as their commissioner. This was similar to interleague play in Major League Baseball, but American Association and Can-Am League were separate legal entities and had separate playoffs/championships.

At the end of the 2013 season, due to the Tucson Padres relocating to their city, the El Paso Diablos suspended operations. The team was eventually revived and relocated, operating as the Joplin Blasters. The Blasters ceased operations after the conclusion of the 2016 season.

On November 19, 2015, Miles Wolff announced that there would no longer be interleague play. It also was announced that for the Amarillo Thunderheads and Grand Prairie AirHogs would operate as a joint team, the Texas AirHogs, playing 25 games in Amarillo and 25 games in Grand Prairie to make up a 12-team league. The team remained in Grand Prairie full-time in 2017, with the Cleburne Railroaders joining the league the same season. Shortly before the 2017 season, the Laredo Lemurs withdrew from the league. They were temporarily replaced by the Salina Stockade from the Pecos League for the season. The Chicago Dogs joined for 2018  and the Milwaukee Milkmen joined in 2019, replacing the Wichita Wingnuts, who folded in large part due to the demolition of Lawrence-Dumont Stadium and their eventual replacement by the Wichita Wind Surge.

In 2020, due to the COVID-19 pandemic, the league announced that 6 of its 12 clubs would play an abbreviated 60-game season beginning on July 3, 2020. Five stadiums were used for gameplay: Sioux Falls Stadium (hosting the Sioux Falls Canaries and St. Paul Saints during July), Newman Outdoor Field (hosting the Fargo-Moorhead RedHawks and Winnipeg Goldeyes), Franklin Field (hosting the Milwaukee Milkmen), Impact Field (hosting the Chicago Dogs), and CHS Field (hosting the St. Paul Saints beginning in August). Players from non-participating teams had the opportunity to be drafted by one of the six active clubs. A limited number of fans were allowed to attend games, in accordance with local government guidelines and restrictions.  

The 2021 season saw the league lose both the Texas AirHogs, who dropped out of the league, and the St. Paul Saints who move to affiliated ball as the Triple-A affiliate of the Minnesota Twins. Joining the league in 2021 is the Kane County Cougars, who were dropped from affiliated ball during the 2021 minor league reorganization, as well as the Houston Apollos who will be a traveling team for the 2021 campaign. 

In May 2021, the league announced the approval of Lake Country Baseball, based in Oconomowoc, Wisconsin, as a new member of the league starting in 2022. Construction commenced later that summer on a new stadium and multi-use indoor sports facility, which opened for play on May 20, 2022 as Wisconsin Brewing Company Park. The team selected the name Lake Country DockHounds, after hosting an online name the team contest. 

With the DockHounds joining the league for the 2022 season, the American Association opted for realignment of the divisions.  Going away from the prior North/South divisions, the league decided to go with East/West divisions. The league placed Cleburne, Chicago, Kane County, Gary SouthShore, Milwaukee, and Lake Country in the East Division; and Winnipeg, Fargo-Moorhead, Sioux Falls, Sioux City, Lincoln, and Kansas City in the West Division. The league also changed the playoff format taking the top four teams in each division into the playoffs, and allowing the team in each division with the best record to choose their first round opponent from the remaining three division teams.

Business model
The American Association (AA) typically recruits college and former major and minor league players. Former affiliated-league players who get injured or have other circumstances join the AA as an opportunity to get re-signed by major league organizations. For example, David Peralta was signed in 2004 as a pitcher for the St. Louis Cardinals but suffered injuries and was released in 2009. He resurrected his career as an outfielder with teams such as the AA's Wichita Wingnuts and Amarillo Sox in 2012 and 2013, then became a starting outfielder for the Arizona Diamondbacks. 

Other players include college players who were not drafted into MLB but seek the opportunity to be seen by major league scouts and possibly get signed by major league organizations. Other former MLB players join the AA as a way to stay involved in baseball after their MLB career, often as coaches and managers.

As of 2008, the salary cap for each team was $100,000, with a minimum salary of $800 per month. The price of an expansion team is also about $750,000. This is in stark contrast with the minor and major leagues. Former Commissioner Miles Wolff stated in an interview that "We have to pay the salaries of the players, which they don't in an affiliated [league]. It's a much riskier business. Just because of the longevity and tradition, we usually don't get the best cities, either, so some of the markets we're in are not great markets. But as I say, I think it's a better product."

In 2018, the league raised the minimum salary to $1,200 per month to comply with the new Save America's Pastime Act.

Roster rules 
Rosters are limited to 25 players, with a maximum of six may be veterans and minimum of five must be rookies or LS-1. The remaining players will be designated limited service players and of those LS players only six (6) may be LS-4. Two of the LS-4 players may have LS-5 status.

Rookie: A player with less than one year of service.

LS-1: A player with fewer than two years of service.

LS-2: A player with fewer than three years of service.

LS-3: A player with fewer than four years of service.

LS-4: A player with fewer than five years of service.

LS-5: A player with less than 6 years of service.

Veteran: A player with six or more years of service. If a player has six or more years of service but has not reached the age of 26 by September 1 of that season, he will be considered an LS-4. If he has not reached the age of 24 by September 1 of that season, he will be considered an LS-3.

Teams

Current teams

League timeline

Former teams 
 Coastal Bend Aviators – founding member of league, originally from Central Baseball League, folded after 2007
 St. Joe Blacksnakes – founding member of league, folded after 2007
 Pensacola Pelicans – founding member of league, originally from Central Baseball League, became the Amarillo Sox
 Fort Worth Cats – founding member of the league, had its membership revoked by the league on October 26, 2011, after failing to provide the league with a letter of credit Moved to the North American League, then United League Baseball, then later folded
 Shreveport-Bossier Captains – moved to Laredo, Texas to become Laredo Lemurs
 El Paso Diablos – suspended operations after the 2013 season to make way for the Triple-A El Paso Chihuahuas. resumed operations in 2015 as the Joplin Blasters
 Amarillo Thunderheads – originally called the Amarillo Sox; merged with the Grand Prairie AirHogs prior to the 2016 season and changed name to Texas AirHogs
 Joplin Blasters – folded following the 2016 season
 Laredo Lemurs – folded following the 2016 season
 Salina Stockade – moved to the Can-Am League as a partial-schedule traveling team following the 2017 season
 Wichita Wingnuts – suspended operations following the 2018 season as their ballpark was to be demolished to make way for a new ballpark and the Double-A Wichita Wind Surge
Texas AirHogs – did not play the 2020 season due to the COVID-19 pandemic, folded after the season
St. Paul Saints – founding member of the league, became the Triple A affiliate of the Minnesota Twins following the 2020 season joining the International League
Houston Apollos - travelling team from the Pecos League brought in for the 2021 season

Champions

All-Star Game
The American Association hosted an annual All-Star Game from 2006 to 2010. The league's first All-Star game was played in El Paso, Texas, on July 18, 2006, which pit a team of American Association All-Stars against an All-Star team from the Can-Am League. Its current format pits the all-stars from each division against each other. There was no All-Star game in 2011, 2012, 2013, 2018, 2020, or 2021. 

Game results
2006 – AA 5, Can-Am 3
2007 – South 6, North 4
2008 – South 11, North 4
2009 – North 6, South 2
2010 – South 12, North 3
2011 – game cancelled 
2012 – game cancelled 
2013 – game cancelled
2014 – South 7, North 0
2015 – North 3, South 1 
2016 – North 6, South 1
2017 – Can-Am 3, AA 2
2018 – game cancelled 
2019 – North 7,  South 3
2020 – game cancelled due to the COVID-19 pandemic
2021 – game cancelled due to the COVID-19 pandemic
2022 — West 7, East 6

Most Valuable Players 
2006 – Pichi Balet, (Lincoln Saltdogs)
2007 – Jorge Alvarez, (El Paso Diablos)
2008 – Beau Torbert, (Sioux Falls Canaries)
2009 – Greg Porter, (Wichita Wingnuts)
2010 – Beau Torbert, (Sioux Falls Canaries)
2011 – Lee Cruz, (Amarillo Sox)
2012 – Nic Jackson, (Fargo-Moorhead RedHawks)
2013 – C. J. Ziegler, (Wichita Wingnuts)
2014 – Brent Clevlen, (Wichita Wingnuts)
2015 – Vinny DiFazio, (St. Paul Saints)
2016 – Nate Samson, (Sioux City Explorers)
2017 – Josh Romanski, (Winnipeg Goldeyes)
2018 – Jose Sermo, (Sioux City Explorers) 
2019 – Keon Barnum, (Chicago Dogs)
2020 – Adam Brett Walker II, (Milwaukee Milkmen)
2021 – Adam Brett Walker II, (Milwaukee Milkmen)
2022 – Jabari Henry, (Sioux Falls Canaries)

League attendance

Attendance Records 
Season: 413,482, St. Paul, 2016

Game: 13,406, El Paso, July 4, 2011

See also
Baseball awards – U.S. independent professional leagues

References

External links

 
Independent baseball leagues in the United States
Baseball leagues in Florida
Baseball leagues in Indiana
Baseball leagues in Iowa
Baseball leagues in Kansas
Baseball leagues in Louisiana
Baseball leagues in Minnesota
Baseball leagues in Missouri
Baseball leagues in Nebraska
Baseball leagues in North Dakota
Baseball leagues in South Dakota
Baseball leagues in Texas
Baseball leagues in Canada
Sports leagues established in 2006
2006 establishments in the United States
501(c)(6) nonprofit organizations
Baseball leagues in Illinois
Baseball leagues in Wisconsin